Christopher Brian Evans (born 13 October 1962) is a Welsh former professional footballer, who after playing, has pursued a successful career in professional football coaching. His most recent coaching role was that of assistant manager at Sheffield Wednesday, which ended on 30 March 2012 by mutual consent

Evans started his career at Arsenal, before joining Stoke City in 1981. After failing to make any appearances he joined York City in 1982, where he made over 100 appearances. He joined Darlington in 1985 and played for them until 1987. After joining Wolverhampton Wanderers as Academy manager in 1991, he left in 2007 to become assistant manager at Bolton Wanderers. He had a spell as caretaker manager at Bolton, taking charge for one match in 2010.

Playing career
Born in Rhondda, Evans and his family moved to Holyhead, Anglesey when he was 9 years old and excelled in schoolboys football before starting his professional football career with Arsenal as an apprentice, before signing a professional contract in June 1980. He moved to Stoke City in August 1981, making no appearances before signing for York City in August 1982. He made his debut in a 1–1 draw with Torquay United on 28 August. He was an ever-present for York during the 1982–83 season, making 52 appearances. He made 22 appearances during the 1983–84 season, with York winning the Fourth Division championship. He lost his place in the team due to injury and after making 113 appearances and scoring one goal, he joined Darlington for a fee of £13,000 in October 1985. His career was effectively brought to an end after breaking his leg in 1987, after making 58 appearances and scoring one goal in the league for Darlington. He signed for Bangor City in 1987.

Style of play
Evans played as a right back.

Coaching and managerial career
He joined Wolverhampton Wanderers as Academy manager in 1991, and after 17 years Evans was appointed as Gary Megson's new Assistant (Performance Director) at Bolton Wanderers on 14 November 2007. In October 2009, his former club reported Bolton and Evans to The Football Association and the Premier League, alleging that they had acted improperly over the transfer of a teenage defender, Mark Connolly, to Bolton in August 2009. He was appointed caretaker manager alongside Steve Wigley following the sacking of Megson on 30 December. His only game in charge was a 4–0 victory over Lincoln City in the FA Cup third round, before Owen Coyle was appointed manager on 8 January 2010, and on 12 January the club confirmed that Evans had left. In February 2011 he was appointed as assistant manager to Megson at Sheffield Wednesday. Evans took over as caretaker manager when Megson was sacked on 29 February 2012, he took charge of one match, against Rochdale on 3 March, before Dave Jones took over as permanent Wednesday manager. On 30 March 2012, Evans left Sheffield Wednesday by mutual consent.

Under Steve McClaren, Evans was appointed Derby County Head of Football Operations (2013–2015) and returned in October 2016 as Technical Director, leaving the club when McClaren was sacked on 12 March 2017.

Career statistics
Source:

Managerial statistics

References

1962 births
Living people
People from Rhondda
Welsh footballers
Association football defenders
Arsenal F.C. players
Stoke City F.C. players
York City F.C. players
Darlington F.C. players
Bangor City F.C. players
English Football League players
Welsh football managers
Bolton Wanderers F.C. managers
Sheffield Wednesday F.C. managers
English Football League managers
Wolverhampton Wanderers F.C. non-playing staff
Bolton Wanderers F.C. non-playing staff
Sheffield Wednesday F.C. non-playing staff